There Goes the Neighborhood (originally to be titled Block Party) is an American prime-time reality television program on CBS. The show premiered on August 9, 2009, and features eight suburban families shut out from the outside world with no television, internet, phones, or contact with anybody outside of their neighborhood. The families will compete in challenges against each other. Each week, one family will be banished from the neighborhood, thereby eliminating the family from contention for the show's $250,000 prize fund. The show's executive producers are Jay Bienstock and Mike Fleiss. The show's presenter is Matt Rogers, a finalist on American Idol 3.

Production 
The show was recorded in Kennesaw, Georgia, a suburb of Atlanta, specifically on the 2500 block of Fairlawn Downs NW in the Legacy Park community's Annandale Main. Electricity and gas utilities for most household luxuries were cut off from each family's home.

Production for the show began in early June 2009. The families being placed into lockdown within the constructed barriers beginning on June 15.

Contestants

Gameplay 
The program's gameplay is extremely similar to that of the American version of Big Brother (specifically Big Brother 2). In each episode, families will compete in a challenge in order to win rewards and safety from elimination. The winner will name two families to face the neighbourhood vote. The families will then vote to force one family to leave the neighborhood for the remainder of the series. In the finale, it is presumed that the six eliminated families will return to the neighborhood to vote for the show's winner.

Voting table 

The voting table below records whom each family voted to stay during its time in the neighborhood. The nominated families are not allowed to vote.

References

External links 
 Official Site (via Internet Archive)

2000s American reality television series
2009 American television series debuts
2009 American television series endings
CBS original programming
Television series by Warner Horizon Television
Television shows filmed in Georgia (U.S. state)